The Continental Bank of Canada is a chartered bank in Canada founded in 2013. A different bank operated under that name in the early 1980s.

First Continental Bank

The first Continental Bank had its origins in 1925 when the Industrial Acceptance Corporation was founded. It became IAC, a financing company, in 1970. Continental Bank of Canada was chartered in 1977 when IAC decided to expand the scope of operations, and began business in June 1979. It had its head office at 130 Adelaide St. West, Toronto. In 1981, it was Canada's ninth-largest bank with 70 branches across the country, and assets at June 30 of $1.6 billion. Also in that year, Continental Bank absorbed its parent company, IAC.

In 1985, after a loss of depositor confidence and a run on deposits that affected several small banks, the bank received a line of Credit from the Bank of Canada. The bank and its remaining 55 branches were then acquired by Lloyds Bank Plc of the United Kingdom and became "Lloyds Bank Canada" in 1986. Continental Bank continued to exist as a chartered bank until 1996 because of a dispute with Revenue Canada. Lloyds Bank sold its Canadian operations to HongKong Bank of Canada in 1990, which became HSBC Bank Canada.

Second Continental Bank
In 2013 a new bank named "Continental Bank of Canada" was chartered. Before being chartered, the company had been operating as Continental Currency Exchange. It continues to operate under that name and focus on providing foreign exchange services through its 19 branches across Ontario.

See also

 List of banks in Canada

References

Defunct banks of Canada
Banks of Canada
Lloyds Banking Group
HSBC acquisitions
1980 establishments in Ontario
2013 establishments in Ontario
Banks established in 2013
Banks established in 1980
Banks disestablished in 1986
Canadian companies established in 2013